Jean-Didier Vincent (7 June 1935) is a French neurobiologist and neuropsychiatrist. He was Professor of Physiology at the Faculty of Medicine of the University of Bordeaux II and then at the University of Paris-Sud. From 1991 to 2004 Vincent was Director of the Alfred-Fessard Institute of Neurobiology at the CNRS. He has been a member of both the French Academy of Sciences and the French Academy of Medicine since 18 November 2003.

Biography 
Vincent was born in Libourne, located in the Gironde department of Bordeaux. He is the only son of a Freemason wine broker.

He studied in Sainte-Foy-la-Grande (Gironde) at a Protestant college whose master intended him to study literature at the École normale supérieure, then at the Lycée Michel-Montaigne in Bordeaux. His parents, wine brokers and Protestants, encouraged him to undertake medical studies at the École du Service de Santé des Armées de Bordeaux. He majored in physics, chemistry and biology. As an intern in clinical services, he met the neuropsychiatrist Jacques Faure, who encouraged him to do research in this field.

Vincent was a hospital biologist in physiology and functional explorations at the CHRU of Bordeaux (1966-1977), Professor without a chair (1973-1978) and professor of physiology at the Bordeaux Faculty of Medicine (1979-1992). He headed the Inserm 176/CNRS "Neurobiology of Behaviours" unit at the Bordeaux University Hospital (1978-1990) before taking over as Director of the Alfred-Fessart Institute in Gif-sur-Yvette from 1992 to 2003. He is Professor of Physiology at the Faculty of Medicine of Paris Sud, Hospital Practitioner at the Kremlin-Bicêtre Hospital (1992-2006) and Professor at the Institut Universitaire de France, Chair of Neuroendocrinology at the Faculty of Medicine of Paris-Sud, Paris XI University (1994-2004).

In 1988, he signed the appeal to François Mitterrand. He has carried out research in neurobiology in the United States (postdoctoral fellowship at the Brain Institute of the University of California, Los Angeles) and then in France (CNRS, Inserm).

Jean-Didier Vincent has been President of the National Council of Programmes at the Ministry of National Education since 2002, member of the CNRS Ethics of Science Committee (COMETS) and the INRA (Institut National de Recherché en Agronomie) Ethics and Precaution Committee for Agricultural Research Applications (COMEPRA). A member of the Executive Board of the Foundation for Political Innovation until 23 January 2009, he has been President of the Association pour l'Université Numérique Francophone Mondiale (UNFM) since October 2005.

Scientific contributions 
Vincent has contributed significantly to the development of neuroendocrinology, which includes the study of interactions between hormones and the nervous system, the brain being also considered as an endocrine gland. He has a more pessimistic vision than his colleague Boris Cyrulnik about what predetermines human behaviour and believes in the primacy of the biological over reason, stating in 2013 in the film La Possibilité d'être humain : "L'homme est libre, oui, mais en liberté surveillée".

He has published numerous books on theory of biology, for example Biologie des passions, La Chair et le diable. In his book he defends a dynamic above all sexual dynamics of love (Eros). He lists the sexual practices that are omnipresent in nature and suggests that the notion of women's property was born during the sedentarization of the Neolithic era. It also details the complexity of sexual systems, which are often designed to frame the reproductive rules of each species.

In his book Bienvenue en Transhumanie, he takes a sceptical look at transhumanism, denouncing a lack of morality that is necessary around this radical transformation of the genome. He fears a disconnection between reproduction and sexuality, and that sexuality is virtualized by directly stimulating the affected parts of the brain.

Other functions 
 Member of the American Academy of Arts and Sciences
 Member of the Academia Europaea
 Member of the Royal Academy of Belgium (science class) 
 Honorary Member of the Royal Academy of Medicine of Belgium
 Member of the French Academy of sciences
 Member of the French Academy of Medicine

Awards and honours  

 1981: La Caze Prize from the Academy of Sciences
 1991: Blaise-Pascal prize
 1996: Medicine and Culture Award from the Institute of Health Sciences
 1998: Gold medal at the University of Prague
 1999: Doctor honoris causa of the Free University of Brussels
 2010: Honorary President of the Société historique et archéologique de Libourne
 Officer of the Légion d'Honneur
 Commander of the Ordre des Palmes Académiques
 Knight of the Ordre du Mérite Agricole

Books 
Jean-Didier Vincent has written several books, the most famous of which is La Biologie des passions and Élisée Reclus, géographe, anarchiste, écologiste which has received the 2010 Femina essai prize.

 La Biologie des passions, éditions Odile Jacob, 1986 et coll. Opus 1994
 Casanova, la contagion du plaisir, éditions Odile Jacob, 1990, (prize Blaise-Pascal)
 Celui qui parlait presque, éditions Odile Jacob, 1993
 La Chair et le Diable, éditions Odile Jacob, 1996
 L'Art de parler la bouche pleine, Éditions de la Presqu'Ile, 1997
 La vie est une fable, éditions Odile Jacob, 1998
 Qu'est-ce que l'homme ?, éditions Odile Jacob, 2000
 Faust : une histoire naturelle, éditions Odile Jacob, 2000
 La Dispute sur le vivant, éditions Desclée de Brouwer, 2000
 Pour une nouvelle philosophie du goût, 2000
 Le Cœur des autres - Biologie de la compassion, éditions Plon, 2003
 Voyage extraordinaire au centre du cerveau, éditions Odile Jacob, 2007
 Élisée Reclus géographe, anarchiste, écologiste, éditions Robert Laffont, 2010 (prize Femina essai)
 Le Sexe expliqué à ma fille, éditions du Seuil, 2010
 Bienvenue en Transhumanie, avec Geneviève Ferone, éditions Grasset, 2011
 Le Cerveau sur mesure, avec Pierre-Marie Lledo, éditions Odile Jacob, 2012
 Biologie du couple, éditions Robert Laffont, 2015
 Le cerveau expliqué à mon petit-fils, éditions du Seuil, 2016

Private life 
Jean-Didier Vincent was married to Lucy Vincent. He has five children from two marriages.

Polemics

On Down's syndrome 
On 5 October 2012, during the program La Tête au carré, broadcast on France Inter, a new test likely to diagnose trisomy 21 in early pregnancy was discussed. Vincent defended this prenatal diagnosis, claiming that "Down's syndrome is a poison in a family. "During the program, Jean-Didier Vincent revisited this statement, which was considered "violent" by host Mathieu Vidard, and withdrew it, calling it an "unfortunate term" but without apologizing.  Éléonore Laloux, a young woman with Down's syndrome and spokesperson for the collective Les Amis d'Éléonore, responded to the biologist in 2013 in a video and in March 2014 in an autobiographical book.

On GMOs 
During the same program Vincent defended the firm Monsanto and made the following comments: "we must use GMOs", "it has rendered great services to agriculture", "it has increased productivity."

Conviction 
On February 12, 2008, during the television show Ce soir ou jamais, he said about Jean-Marie Le Pen: "We knew him as the white wolf, he was a bastard", and added: "he probably committed crimes, but I can't say it on the air". On 28 May 2009, the Paris Court of Appeal found him guilty of insult (first sentence) and defamation (second sentence), and sentenced him to a suspended fine of €1,500 and €4,000.

References

1935 births
People from Libourne
French neuroscientists
French neurologists
French psychiatrists
French science writers
École Normale Supérieure alumni
Members of the French Academy of Sciences
Members of Academia Europaea
Living people
Academic staff of the University of Bordeaux
Academic staff of Paris-Saclay University
Research directors of the French National Centre for Scientific Research
Prix Femina essai winners